Serhiy Mykolayovych Ryzhuk (born 20 January 1950, Chudniv, Ukraine) is a Ukrainian politician, member of the Verkhovna Rada.

In 1973-1991 he worked at leading positions of Communist party and Komsomol in the region. 

In 1991-2004 Ryzhuk worked at the Ministry of Agrarian Policy.

In 2004-2005 he also served as a Governor of Zhytomyr Oblast. 

In 2006-2010 Ryzhuk was a member of the Verkhovna Rada representing Party of Regions.

In 2010-2014 he again served as a Governor of Zhytomyr Oblast.

References

External links
 Profile at the Official Ukraine Today portal

1950 births
Living people
People from Chudniv
Agriculture ministers of Ukraine
Governors of Zhytomyr Oblast
Sixth convocation members of the Verkhovna Rada
Fifth convocation members of the Verkhovna Rada
Party of Regions politicians